Nate Carr (born June 24, 1960 in Erie, Pennsylvania) is an American collegiate and international level freestyle wrestler.   He grew up in a family of 16 children.  Five of these, including Nate, would become All-American wrestlers (an NCAA record) and two, again including Nate, would compete in the Olympic Games. In 2003, Carr was inducted into the National Wrestling Hall of Fame as a Distinguished Member.

High school
During his high school career at Erie Tech, Carr, coached by Tom Carr (no relation), posted a record of 115-7 and collected a Pennsylvania State Championship.

College
Upon his graduation from Erie Tech, Carr received a wrestling scholarship to Iowa State University. There he had a career record of 117-20-1 in the 150 pound weight class.  He earned three NCAA championships and two Big Eight Conference Titles.

International competition
After graduation from Iowa State, Carr continued his freestyle wrestling career at the international level.  In 1983 Carr earned a spot on the World Championship team.  In 1986 he won both the World Cup and the Pan-American Championships.

He began training for the 1988 Olympic Games in Seoul while working as an assistant coach at West Virginia University.  While staying in the Olympic Village, Carr did not participate in any of the recreational activities offered to the athletes because he felt it would interfere with his singleminded focus toward winning gold. At the Games he wrestled to the semifinal match and won a bronze medal. There have been accusations of a scoring error by a judge which may have adversely affected his placement.

He returned as a member of the World Championship team in 1990 and also won his weight class at the Goodwill Games.

Subsequent career and family
Carr continued his participation in the sport as an assistant coach at West Virginia University.  After his retirement from WVU, he moved to Jones County, GA.  There, his son, Nate Carr, Jr. was a nationally ranked high school wrestler and 3-time state champion.  Nate, Jr. originally committed to West Virginia University, but instead opted to attend Iowa Central Community College where he won the NJCAA 157 lb. National Title. Nate Carr currently works as the head club coach for the Regional Training Center at Iowa State University where his youngest son David is a member of the wrestling team.

References

External links
 West Virginia University
 Wrestling Hall of Fame
 Brainy History
 West Virginia University Alumni Magazine

Wrestlers at the 1988 Summer Olympics
American male sport wrestlers
African-American sport wrestlers
Olympic bronze medalists for the United States in wrestling
Living people
1960 births
Iowa State Cyclones wrestlers
Sportspeople from Erie, Pennsylvania
Medalists at the 1988 Summer Olympics
American wrestling coaches
Competitors at the 1990 Goodwill Games
21st-century African-American people
20th-century African-American sportspeople